Lyallpur Khalsa College for Women is located in Jalandhar, Punjab. It was established in 1960 as a girl's section of the Lyallpur Khalsa College with the efforts of Principal Ram Singh Sachdev. He managed both colleges for two years before the management committee agreed to appoint Mrs Avtar Kaur Singh as the first female Principal and Mrs Dan Kaur her deputy. This gave the college more autonomy. Over time, however, it has become an independent, self-supporting school. The hostel has a dormitory established on campus. A gurudwara on campus also allows the Sikh population to pray during religious holidays.

Sports
The department of Physical Education was established by S. K. Avtar Singh back in 1960 who later also served as principal of the college. Mrs. Karminder Chaudhary was appointed as Director of the Physical Education department at that time.

Notable alumni
 Rajbir Kaur, Woman's Indian Hockey Team 
 Gurjit Kaur, Woman's Indian Hockey Team

References
http://www.lkcwj.com/

Women's universities and colleges in Punjab, India
Education in Jalandhar
Educational institutions established in 1960
1960 establishments in East Punjab